Eclipse is a Swedish rock band from Stockholm, formed in 1999. The band’s current lineup consists of vocalist Erik Mårtensson, guitarist  Magnus Henriksson, drummer Philip Crusner, and bassist Victor Crusner.

History
The band was formed in 1999 in Stockholm by singer/guitarist/bassist Erik Mårtensson and drummer/keyboardist Anders Berlin. Together with guitarist Magnus Henriksson they received a record deal with English label Z Records. The band's debut album, The Truth and A Little More was released in 2001.

Eclipse later received a contract with the Italian label Frontiers Records in April 2004 released the album Second To None. In 2008, they released the album Are You Ready to Rock. Erik Mårtensson then wrote most of the song material for the side project WET which consisted of members from Work of Art (W), Eclipse (E) and Talisman (T). Their self-titled debut was released in 2009 and became famous in the genre of melodic hard rock and the AOR radio format.

In 2012, they released the album Bleed & Scream. The title track was released as a single and also became the band's first official video. The album entered Sverigetopplistan at number-44.

The band released their fifth album Armageddonize in February 2015, which debuted at number-49 on Sverigetopplistan. On 30, November 2015, SVT announced that Eclipse would participate in Melodifestivalen 2016 with the song "Runaways". The song was written by Erik Mårtensson, and competed in the fourth semi-final which took place February 27 in Gävle. Eclipse finished in fifth place and were eliminated from the competition.

The band released their sixth album Monumentum in March 2017 and then appeared on day 1 of the Frontiers Rock Festival IV held in Trezzo (Milano), Italy, 29–30 March 2017. In support of the album release, the band started a nine-country 18-date tour on 31 March 2017.

Members

Current
Erik Mårtensson – vocals, guitar, bass (1999–present)
Magnus Henriksson – guitar (1999–present)
Philip Crusner – drums (2015–present)
Victor Crusner – bass (2019–present)

Former
Robban Bäck – drums (2006–2015)
Magnus Ulfstedt – bass (2014–2019), drums (2000–2006) 
Anders Berlin – drums, keyboard, percussion (1999–2004)
Fredrik Folkare – bass (2003–2008)
Johannes Kagelind – bass
Peter Hallgren – bass
Johan Berlin – keyboard (2006–2014)

Guest performances in the studio
Mats Olausson – keyboard
Kee Marcello – guitar
Annelie Pandora Magnusson - vocals
Madeleine Johansson – cello
Johan Fahlberg - background vocals
David Wallin - background vocals

Discography

Studio albums
 The Truth and a Little More (2001)
 Second to None (2004)
 Are You Ready to Rock (2008)
 Bleed & Scream (2012)
 Are You Ready to Rock MMXIV (2014)
 Armageddonize (2015)
 Monumentum (2017)
 Paradigm (2019)
 Wired (2021)

Live albums
Viva La VicTOURia (Live) (2020)

Single
"Bleed & Scream" / "Come Hell or High Water" / "Into the Fire" (2012)
"Stand On Your Feet" (2015)
"Runaways" (2016)
"Vertigo"  (2017) [released 12 January 2017; 1st single from Momentum]
"Never Look Back" (2017) [released 31 January 2017; 2nd single from Momentum]

References

External links 
 Facebook (official)
 website (official)
 Vertigo
 Never Look Back
 Frontiers Music srl

Swedish rock music groups
Swedish hard rock musical groups
Swedish glam metal musical groups
Musical groups from Stockholm
Musical groups established in 1999
1999 establishments in Sweden
Frontiers Records artists
Melodifestivalen contestants of 2016